A cricket team representing the East African countries of Kenya, Tanzania, Uganda and Zambia toured England in the 1975 season which coincided with their participation in the 1975 Cricket World Cup.

The 1975 touring team played eleven matches, including the three One Day International matches in the world cup. Five were warm-up matches before the world cup and three were held afterwards, including one in Denmark.

Team

Tour matches
The following matches were played during the tour:

References

East Africa in international cricket
International cricket competitions from 1970–71 to 1975